Mikael Redin (born 25 February 1989) is a figure skater who competes in men's singles for Switzerland. He is the 2011 Swiss national champion and competed at two World Championships.

Programs

Competitive highlights 
JGP: Junior Grand Prix

References

External links

 

Swiss male single skaters
1989 births
Living people
Sportspeople from Metz